Latif al-Ani (1932 – 18 November 2021) was an Iraqi photographer, often known as "the father of Iraqi photography" and noted for his photographic works that combine both ancient and modern themes. During his active career from the 1950s through to the late-1970s, he chronicled an Iraq way of life that was rapidly being lost as the country embarked on a modernisation program. He documented people, ancient monuments and many facets of urban life in Iraq. He stopped taking photographs following the rise of Saddam Hussein, finding that he was unable to maintain his former optimistic outlook for Iraq's future.

Life and career 

Latif al-Ani was born in Baghdad in 1932. During his childhood, relatively few commercial photographers were operating in Iraq. The social and religious prohibitions on making images and figurative representations meant that Iraq was relatively late-adopter of photography and cinematography. A handful of photographers and film-makers, such as Abdul-Karim Tiouti and Murad al-Daghistani, had been operating in Basra and Mosul since the late 19th-century and the early 20th-century, but opportunities for young Iraqis to learn the art of photography were rare. It was not until the late 1940s, when Al-Ani was an adolescent that the number of commercial photographic studios in Iraq's major cities, including Baghdad, proliferated.

Al-Ani was first exposed to photography when, as a boy, he would help in his older brother's Mutanabbi Street shop which was adjacent to the studio of a Jewish photographer, by the name of Nissan. The young Al-Ani was fascinated. Noting the boy's interest, Al Ani's brother bought him a camera, a Kodak box, in around 1947, when al-Ani was 15 years. After that, the camera never left his side. His earliest photos were of the everyday scenes and objects in his immediate surroundings- street life, palms, plants, faces and people on rooftops. This type of subject matter would become a recurring theme in his work.

In the 1950s, he seized the opportunity to embark on a career in photography. A friend of al-Ani's, Aziz Ajam, was working as an editor for the Iraqi Petroleum Company's in-house magazine. Al-Ani applied for a traineeship there, and in 1954, he began working under the direction of Jack Percival, and effectively became his apprentice. While at IPC, al-Ani learned all aspects of photography, including aerial work. As a staff member of the IPC, he took photographs for the company’s Arabic-language magazine, Ahl al-Naf [People of Oil] under Percival's watchful eye. This provided further opportunities to document the social and cultural life of Iraq. Throughout his career, he felt compelled to record a way of life that he feared was being lost as the country embarked on a period of 'modernisation'. Al-Ani was an optimist and “wanted to show Iraq as a civilised, modern place." At the same time, he was proud of Iraq's ancient Sumerian and Mesopotamian past.

Al-Ani had an instinct for juxtaposing the layers of Iraq's ancient art heritage with distinctly modern themes. His work has been influenced by mid-20th century Iraqi artists, including Jawad Saleem. For example, his portrait of the US Couple in Ctesiphon shows an American couple visiting the Taq Kisra (arch at Ctesiphon) in the background, while they listen to an elderly Bedouin man seated on the ground playing the rabab.

In the 1960s and 70s he enjoyed international success, working and exhibiting in the Middle East, Europe and the United States. However, he stopped taking photographs in 1979 when Saddam Hussein's regime placed a ban on taking photographs in public. Not only was it dangerous to take photographs in public, but al-Ani had lost his optimistic outlook for Iraq's future.

After al-Ani's retirement, his work was virtually forgotten. He recalled stopping at a news kiosk in 2005 where they were giving away free calendars; and upon inspection, he realised that more than half of the photographs were his own work, but reproduced without any attribution to him since no one knew the photographer. His contribution to Iraqi art and culture was 'rediscovered' by a team from the Ruya Foundation, who were working to preserve Iraq's artistic heritage and came across al-Ani's collection. In late 2017, they mounted a solo exhibition of Al-Ani's work at Coningsby Gallery in London. This event, combined with the publication of a monograph about the artist, stirred considerable interest in the photographer and his work.

Al-Ani died on 18 November 2021, at the age of 89 in Baghdad.

Work
The majority of his photographs are in black and white.  His ability to combine Iraq's ancient art heritage within a contemporary format suggests that he was influenced by mid-20th century Iraqi artists, including Jawad Saleem.

As with many Iraqi artists, much of his archive was destroyed or looted during the US invasion of Iraq of 2003. The archive of Arab Image Foundation has several hundred surviving al-Ani photographs.

Select list of published photographs
 Lady in the Eastern Desert
 US Couple in Ctesiphon 
 Haidar-Khana Mosque, Rashid Street, Baghdad 
 Building the Darbandikhan Dam
 Al Malak, Baghdad
 Architecture in Baghdad, Bab Al Muadham

Legacy

He is the subject of two books: 
 Tamara Chalabi and Morad Montazami, Latif Al Ani, Hajte Cantz, 2017, 
 Hoor Al Qasimi, Kathleen Butti and Muʼassasaẗ al-Šāriqaẗ li-l-funūn, Latif Al Ani: Through the Lens, 1953-1979, Sharjah Art Foundation, 2018

See also

 History of photography
 Iraqi art
 List of Iraqi artists

References

External links
 Arab Image Foundation - digital resource, currently digitising hundreds of photographs made by Latif al-Ani and other Arab photographers]
 http://www.iraqsinvisiblebeauty.com/ - documentary about the life and work of Latif Al Ani

1932 births
2021 deaths
Artists from Baghdad
Iraqi photographers
Pioneers of photography